Hypobathreae is a flowering plant tribe in the subfamily Ixoroideae.

References 

Ixoroideae tribes